"Borderline"  is a song recorded by South Korean singer-songwriter Sunmi. It is the closing track on her third extended play 1/6 (2021), which was released on August 6, 2021, through Abyss Company. The song was written by Sunmi and its composer, Frants. "Borderline" is mid-tempo alternative rock track that confronts the singer's experience with Borderline personality disorder. Sunmi won an award for "Best Lyricist (Overseas)" with the track at the 2021 Asian Pop Music Awards.

Background
The song was debuted on her Warning Tour and was not originally planned to be released. In February 2019, the singer shared the lyrics for "Borderline". During a March 2019 interview with Pop Crush, Sunmi described the track saying "It's about me, but I think it's a song everyone can relate to when they hear it." On August 19, 2020 the special video for "Borderline" was released. On August 28, the singer uploaded an interview on her YouTube channel, where she details the reasons behind the lyrics and conceptual choices for the special video.

Composition and reception
"Borderline" was written by Sunmi and its composer, Frants. The song is an atmospheric, retro, mid-tempo track about her experience with Borderline Personality Disorder. Drawing influences from alternative rock and indie rock the track features a deep arrangement and the singer's "charming" low-pitched voice. In terms of musical notation, the song is composed in the key of A minor, with a tempo of 113 beats per minute, and runs for two minutes and fifty-four seconds. Angela Patricia Suacillo from NME noted that the song "showcases Sunmi’s ability to paint vivid imagery through her songwriting." Many music critics noted the track for being "raw" and "emotionally honest" about something so personal to Sunmi, giving exposure and awareness to her disorder.

Accolades

Live performances
"Borderline" was featured on the setlist of Sunmi's Warning Tour in 2019. On March 13, 2021 the singer performed the song on You Hee-yeol's Sketchbook. During the OUTNOW Unlimited, held on August 8, 2021, the singer performed a medley of "Narcissism" and "Borderline".

Credits and personnel
Credits are adapted from Melon,

 Sunmi – Vocals, songwriter
 Frants – Songwriter, bass, keyboard, computer programming
 Ahn Sung Hoon – Guitar
 DR in idiotape – Drums
 Jo Sang Hyun – Audio mixing, record engineering
 Oh Hye Seok – Record engineering
 Choi Ja Yeon - Record engineering
 Kwon Nam-woo – Audio mastering

Release history

References

Sunmi songs